The 1905 European Figure Skating Championships were held on January 22 in Bonn, German Empire. Elite figure skaters competed for the title of European Champion in the category of men's singles. The competitors performed only compulsory figures.

Results

Men

Judges:
 Ludwig Fänner 
 Fritz Hellmund 
 Gilbert Fuchs 
 J. Schuhmacher 
 Otto Schöning

References

Sources
 Result list provided by the ISU

European Figure Skating Championships, 1905
European Figure Skating Championships
European 1905
Sports competitions in Bonn
1905 in German sport
January 1905 sports events
20th century in Bonn
1900s in Prussia